The Sweet Life is a Philippine television lifestyle informative show broadcast by Q. Hosted by Lucy Torres, Iza Calzado, Grace Lee and Wilma , it premiered in March 19, 2007. The show concluded on February 18, 2011.

Hosts

 Lucy Torres
 Wilma 
 Iza Calzado
 Grace Lee

Segments
 Wilma Does It! features tips from Wilma .
 Project Time features projects made by Lucy Torres-Gomez from old junk available at our homes. It is also accompanied by a guest who will give an artwork or a thing from his/hers or their family members.

References

2007 Philippine television series debuts
2011 Philippine television series endings
Filipino-language television shows
Philippine television shows
Q (TV network) original programming